Freikorps were German volunteer military or paramilitary units. The term was originally applied to voluntary armies formed in German lands from the middle of the 18th century onwards. Between World War I and World War II the term was also used for the anti-communist paramilitary organizations that arose during the Weimar Republic. This is a partial list of the post-World War I Freikorps members.

Freikorps members 

Hugo von Abercron, German aviation pioneer
Wilhelm Albert, SS General
Herbert Albrecht, NSDAP Gauleiter in Mecklenburg-Lübeck
Friedrich Alpers, SS General
Ludolf-Hermann von Alvensleben, SS General
Ludolf Jakob von Alvensleben, SS Colonel
Benno von Arent, SS Colonel
Karl Astel, racial scientist and eugenicist
Erich von dem Bach-Zelewski, SS General
Hermann Balck, German Army General
Rudolf Bamler, German Army General
Eleonore Baur, SS nurse and NSDAP member
Hans Baur, SS General
Gottlob Berger, SS General
Theodor Berkelmann, SS General
Rudolph Berthold, World War I ace
Lothar Beutel, SS General
Walther Bierkamp, SS General
Helmut Bischoff, SS Lieutenant Colonel
Wilhelm Bittrich, SS General
Dr. Kurt Blome, Nazi physician/SA General
Hans-Jürgen von Blumenthal, German Army Major
Günther Blumentritt, German Army General
Fedor von Bock, German Army Field Marshal
Friedrich-Wilhelm Bock, SS Colonel
Karl Bodenschatz, Luftwaffe General
Adolf von Bomhard, SS General
Martin Bormann, Secretary to the Führer/SS General
Ferdinand Brandner, SS Colonel
Fritz von Brodowski, German Army General
Helmuth Brückner, NSDAP Gauleiter of Silesia/SA General
Wilhelm Brückner, SA General 
Karl Brunner, SS General
Franz Büchner, World War I Air ace
Josef Bürckel, NSDAP Gauleiter of Westmark/SS General
Wilhelm Burgdorf, German Army General
Hans Georg Calmeyer, German lawyer
Wilhelm Canaris, German Navy Admiral/Chief of Military Intelligence
Hellmut von der Chevallerie, German Army General
Kurt von der Chevallerie, German Army General
Friedrich Christiansen, Luftwaffe General
Leonardo Conti, SS General
Max de Crinis, SS Colonel
Kurt Daluege, Chief of the Order Police/SS General
Richard Walther Darré, NSDAP Reichsleiter/SS General
Otto Deßloch, Luftwaffe General
Heinrich Deubel, SS Colonel
Karl Diebitsch, SS Colonel
Christoph Diehm, SS General
Eduard Dietl, German Army General
Josef Dietrich, SS General
Oskar Dirlewanger, SS Colonel
Heinrich Graf zu Dohna-Schlobitten, German Army General
Harry Domela, imposter
Hans Döring, SS General
Anton Dunckern, SS General
Karlfried Graf Dürckheim, Nazi diplomat and propagandist
Freiherr Karl von Eberstein, SS General
Charles Edward, Duke of Saxe-Coburg and Gotha, SA General
Hermann Ehrhardt, SS General
Franz Ritter von Epp, NSDAP Reichsstatthalter of Bavaria/German Army General
Karl Ernst, SA General
Georg Escherich, German politician
Hermann Esser, Vice President of the Reichstag
Nikolaus von Falkenhorst, German Army General
Hermann Fegelein, SS General
Richard Fiedler, SS General
Hans Frank, Governor-General of Poland/SA General
Karl Hermann Frank, SS General
Fritz Freitag, SS General
Wessel Freytag von Loringhoven, German Army Colonel
Helmuth Friedrichs, SS General
Hermann Foertsch, German Army General
Wilhelm Fuchs, SS Colonel
Fritz Fullriede, German Army General
Wolfgang Fürstner, German Army Captain
Karl Gebhardt, SS General
Hans Ferdinand Geisler, Luftwaffe General
Richard Glücks, SS General
Wilhelm Göcke, SS Colonel
Ellery von Gorrissen, SS Lieutenant Colonel
Curt von Gottberg, SS General
Ulrich Grauert, Luftwaffe General
Ernst-Robert Grawitz, SS General
Heinz Greiner, German Army General
Arthur Greiser, NSDAP Gauleiter of Wartheland/SS General
Adam Grünewald, SS Major
Heinz Guderian, German Army General
Prince Gustav of Thurn and Taxis, Thule Society member
Hans Hahne, German Army General
Wilhelm Harster, SS General
Paul Hausser, SS General
Franz Hayler, SS General
Richard Heidrich, Luftwaffe General
Edmund Heines, Deputy SA Chief-of-Staff
Gotthard Heinrici, German Army General
Werner Heisenberg, German physicist
August Heissmeyer, SS General
Wolf-Heinrich Graf von Helldorf, SA General
Konrad Henlein, NSDAP Gauleiter of Sudetenland/SS General
Paul Hennicke, SS General
Eberhard Herf, SS General
Maximilian von Herff, SS General
Rudolf Hess, Deputy Führer
Reinhard Heydrich, SS General
Peter von Heydebreck, SA General
Konstantin Hierl, NSDAP Reichsleiter
Ernst-Albrecht Hildebrandt, SS Colonel
Friedrich Hildebrandt, NSDAP Gauleiter of Mecklenburg/SS General
Richard Hildebrandt, SS General
Gebhard Ludwig Himmler, SS Colonel
Heinrich Himmler, Reichsführer-SS
Hans Hinkel, SS General
Paul Hinkler, NSDAP Gauleiter of Halle-Merseburg
Kurt Hintze, SS General
Rudolf Hoess, SS Lieutenant Colonel/Kommandant of Auschwitz
Karl Höfer, SS General
Hermann Höfle, SS General
Otto Hofmann, SS General
Paul Hofmann, NSDAP Gauleiter of Magdeburg-Anhalt
Hans Albert Hohnfeldt, NSDAP Gauleiter of Danzig
Hermann Hoth, German Army General
Adolf Hühnlein, NSDAP Reichsleiter/SA General
Hans Hüttig, SS Major
Bernhard von Hülsen, German Army General
Friedrich Gustav Jaeger, German Army Colonel
Friedrich Jeckeln, SS General
Hans Jeschonnek, Luftwaffe General
Ferdinand Jodl, German Army General
Rudolf Jordan, NSDAP Gauleiter of Halle-Merseburg/SA General
Josias, Hereditary Prince of Waldeck and Pyrmont, SS General
Edgar Julius Jung, German lawyer
Hans Jüttner, SS General
Richard Kaaserer, SS General
Walther Kadow, German schoolteacher
Ernst Kaltenbrunner, SS General
Hans Kammler, SS General
Ernst Kantorowicz, Medieval historian
Wolfgang Kapp, German lawyer and politician
Siegfried Kasche, Nazi Ambassador/SA General
Karl Kaufmann, NSDAP Gauleiter of Hanover/SS General
Kurt Kaul, SS General
Wilhelm Keitel, German Army Field Marshal
Werner Kempf, German Army General
Ulrich Kessler, Luftwaffe General
Dr. Emil Ketterer, SA General
Manfred Freiherr von Killinger, SS General
Matthias Kleinheisterkamp, SS General
Paul Ludwig Ewald von Kleist, German Field Marshal
Waldemar Klingelhöfer, SS Major
Hans Ulrich Klintzsch, Supreme SA Leader
Erich Koch, NSDAP  Gauleiter of East Prussia/SA General
Paul Körner, SS General
Gerret Korsemann, SS General
Albert Krebs, NSDAP Gauleiter of Hamburg
Heinrich Kreipe, German Army General
Hermann Kriebel, NSDAP supporter
Friedrich-Wilhelm Krüger, SS General
Walter Krüger, SS General
Georg von Küchler, German Army Field Marshal
Otto Lasch, German Army General
Johann von Leers, SS Major and Propaganda Ministry official
Karl Lenz, NSDAP Gauleiter of Hesse-Darmstadt
Arthur Liebehenschel, SS Officer
Georg Lindemann, German Army General
Karl Linder, NSDAP Gauleiter of Hesse-Nassau
Wilhelm List, German Army Field Marshal
Wilhelm Friedrich Loeper, NSDAP Gauleiter of Magdeburg-Anhalt/SS General
Bruno Loerzer, Luftwaffe General
Werner Lorenz, SS General
Walther von Lüttwitz, German Army General
Viktor Lutze, SA Chief-of-Staff
Eberhard von Mackensen, German Army General
Johann-Erasmus Freiherr von Malsen-Ponickau, SS General
Hasso von Manteuffel, German Army General
Erich Marcks, German Army General
Benno Martin, SS General
Emil Maurice, first Supreme SA Leader/SS Colonel
Karl Mauss, German General
Josef Albert Meisinger, SS Colonel
Günther Merk, SS General
Erhard Milch, Luftwaffe Field Marshal
Rudolf Mildner, SS Colonel
Paul Moder, SS General
Thomas Müller, SS Colonel
Eugen Munder, NSDAP Gauleiter in Württemberg
Max Näther, World War I ace
Hermann Niehoff, German Army General
Friedrich T. Noltenius, World War I ace
Carl Oberg, SS General
Karl von Oberkamp, SS General
Waldemar Pabst, ordered the executions of Rosa Luxemburg and Karl Liebknecht
Günther Pancke, SS General
Rudolf Pannier, SS Colonel
Helmuth von Pannwitz, German Army General/SS General
Friedrich Paulus, German Army Field Marshal
Heinz Pernet, SA General
Franz Pfeffer von Salomon, Supreme SA Leader
Horst von Pflugk-Harttung, German intelligence officer and spy
Oswald Pohl, SS General
Maximilian Ritter von Pohl, Luftwaffe General
Werner Preuss, World War I ace
Hans-Adolf Prützmann, SS General
Karl-Jesko von Puttkamer, German Navy Admiral
Hermann-Bernhard Ramcke, Luftwaffe General
Johann Rattenhuber, SS General
Hanns Albin Rauter, SS General
Eggert Reeder, SS General
Walter von Reichenau, German Army Field Marshal
Heinz Reinefarth, SS General
Bolko von Richthofen, German archaeologist and Ahnenerbe member 
Hans-Joachim Riecke, SS General
Ernst August Rode, SS General
Manfred Roeder, Luftwaffe General and military judge
Arthur Rödl, SS Colonel
Ernst Röhm, SA Chief-of-Staff
Beppo Römer, KPD member
Gotthard Sachsenberg, World War I ace
Theo Saevecke, SS Captain
Ernst von Salomon, Organisation Consul member
Ferdinand von Sammern-Frankenegg, SS Officer
Dietrich von Saucken, German Army General
Emanuel Schäfer, SS Colonel
Julius Schaub, SS General
Hans Schemm, an NSDAP Gauleiter in Bavaria
Julian Scherner, SS Colonel
Walter Schimana, SS General
Albert Leo Schlageter, anti-French saboteur
Fritz Schlessmann, NSDAP Acting Gauleiter in Essen/SS General
Wilhelm Schmalz, German Army General
August Schmidthuber, SS General
Erich Schmiedicke, NSDAP Deputy Gauleiter in Berlin and Brandenburg
Philipp Johann Adolf Schmitt, SS Major
Rudolf Schmundt, German Army General
Otto Schniewind, German Navy Admiral
Eugen Ritter von Schobert, German Army General
Carl-August von Schoenebeck, Luftwaffe General
Fritz von Scholz, SS General
Karl Eberhard Schöngarth, SS General
Ferdinand Schörner, German Army Field Marshal
Julius Schreck, first Reichsführer-SS
Walther Schröder, SS General
Walther Schultze, SS General
Erwin Schulz, SS General
Paul Schulz, NSDAP Organization Department Head
Horst Schumann, SS Major
Rudolf von Sebottendorf, founder of the Thule Society
Hans Seidemann, Luftwaffe General
Franz Seldte, Reich Minister for Labor/SA General
Emil Sembach, SS Colonel
Max Simon, SS General
Friedrich Sixt, German Army General
Otto Skorzeny, SS Lieutenant Colonel
Hugo Sperrle, Luftwaffe Field Marshal
Jakob Sporrenberg, SS General
Franz Walter Stahlecker, SS General
Felix Steiner, SS General
Walter Stennes, SA General
Hermann Stieve, German physician
Gregor Strasser, NSDAP Organization Leader
Otto Strasser, NSDAP publisher and journalist
Bruno Streckenbach, SS General
Wilhelm Stuckart, SS General
Günther Tamaschke, SS Colonel
Theobald Thier, SS General
Harald Turner, SS General
Friedrich Uebelhoer, SS General
Rudolf Veiel, German Army General
Josef Veltjens, Luftwaffe Colonel
Otmar Freiherr von Verschuer, German geneticist and eugenicist 
Hans Voss, German Navy Admiral
Hans-Erich Voss, German Navy Admiral
Hilmar Wäckerle, SS Colonel
Otto Wagener, German Army General
Walter Warlimont, German Army General
Christian Weber, SS General
Dr. Friedrich Weber, SS General
Walther Wenck, German Army General
Richard Wendler, SS General
Otto Winkelmann, SS General
Karl Wolff, SS General
Udo von Woyrsch, SS General
Alfred Wünnenberg, Chief of the Order Police/SS General
Karl Zech, SS General
Carltheo Zeitschel, SS Major
Carl Zenner, SS General
Alexander Zenzes, World War I Ace

References

External links

Axis History Factbook; Freikorps section – By Marcus Wendel and contributors;  site also contains an apolitical forum
Freikorps Master list on Axis History Forum {reference only}

 
Anti-communism
Military history of Germany
Political repression in Germany
Terrorism in Germany
Counter-revolutionaries
German Revolution of 1918–1919